Paige Nicole Parker (born January 24, 1996) is an American, former collegiate four-time All-American, professional softball pitcher and current assistant head coach at Utah. She played college softball at Oklahoma, and won back-to-back National Championships with the Sooners in 2016 and 2017. Parker is a career record holder for perfect games (4) for the school and also ranks top-10 in the Big 12 Conference and the NCAA Division I for the same category. She was drafted sixth overall in the 2018 NPF Draft and went on to play for the USSSA Pride.

Playing career
She attended Truman High School in Independence, Missouri. She later attended the University of Oklahoma, where she pitched for the Oklahoma Sooners softball team. Parker led the Sooners to back-to-back Women's College World Series championships in 2016 and 2017.

Parker was drafted sixth overall in the 2018 NPF Draft and went on to play for the USSSA Pride.

Coaching career
On October 5, 2018, Parker was named assistant coach for William Jewell College softball team.

On September 18, 2019, Parker was named volunteer assistant coach for Oklahoma.

On July 31, 2020, Parker was named assistant coach for Tulsa.

On August 13, 2021, Parker was named assistant coach for Utah.

Career Statistics

References

External links
 
Oklahoma bio
USSA Pride Bio

1996 births
Living people
American softball coaches
American softball players
Oklahoma Sooners softball players
People from Independence, Missouri
Softball players from Missouri
Tulsa Golden Hurricane softball coaches
USSSA Pride players
Utah Utes softball coaches
William Jewell Cardinals softball coaches
Women's College World Series Most Outstanding Player Award winners